Dmytro Parfyonov, Dmitry Parfenov (born 11 September 1974) is a Ukrainian football manager and a former defender. He is the manager of Russian club Rodina Moscow.

Playing career
Parfyonov is best known as a player of Chornomorets Odesa and Spartak Moscow. He spent seven years playing for Spartak Moscow in the Russian Premier League, earning several champion's titles.

Coaching career
On 21 May 2018, following FC Tosno's relegation from the Russian Premier League, he signed as a manager for FC Ural Yekaterinburg. He resigned from Ural on 19 July 2020 following a defeat in the 2019–20 Russian Cup semifinal to FC Khimki.

On 2 November 2020, he was hired by FC Arsenal Tula. He left Arsenal by mutual consent on 3 September 2021, with the club in the relegation spot.

On 11 June 2022, Parfyonov signed with Rodina Moscow, newly promoted into the second-tier Russian Football National League.

Honours
 Russian Premier League champion: 1998, 1999, 2000, 2001.
 Russian Premier League runner-up: 2005.
 Russian Premier League bronze: 2002.
 Russian Cup winner: 1998.
 Ukrainian Premier League runner-up: 1995, 1996.
 Ukrainian Premier League bronze: 1993, 1994.
 Ukrainian Cup winner: 1992, 1994.

European club competitions
With FC Spartak Moscow.

 UEFA Champions League 1998–99: 7 games.
 UEFA Champions League 1999–2000: 8 games.
 UEFA Cup 1999–2000: 2 games.
 UEFA Champions League 2000–01: 7 games.
 UEFA Champions League 2001–02: 6 games.
 UEFA Cup 2003–04: 4 games, 1 goal.

References

External links
 
 
 
 

1974 births
Living people
Footballers from Odesa
Soviet footballers
Ukrainian footballers
Association football defenders
Ukraine international footballers
Ukraine under-21 international footballers
Soviet Union youth international footballers
Russian Premier League players
Ukrainian Premier League players
Ukrainian Second League players
FC Spartak Moscow players
FC Dynamo Moscow players
FC Saturn Ramenskoye players
FC Arsenal Kyiv players
FC Chornomorets Odesa players
FC Dnipro players
FC Dnipro-2 Dnipropetrovsk players
Ukrainian expatriate footballers
FC Khimki players
FC Arsenal Tula players
Expatriate footballers in Russia
Ukrainian expatriate sportspeople in Russia
Naturalised citizens of Russia
FC Tosno managers
Russian Premier League managers
FC Ural Yekaterinburg managers
FC Arsenal Tula managers